Thomas McKean High School is a comprehensive public high school located on 301 McKennan's Church Road in unincorporated New Castle County, Delaware, with a Wilmington postal address. It is a part of the Red Clay Consolidated School District. The school opened in December 1966, and its first class graduated in June 1967.

McKean serves, in addition to portions of Wilmington, Elsmere, and portions of Pike Creek and Hockessin. A sliver of Pike Creek Valley coincides with the McKean zone.

Traditions 
Having selected Thomas McKean, a signer of the United States Declaration of Independence, as its namesake, the school followed several traditions associated with the Scottish heritage of Thomas McKean. The mascot is a fierce Highlander, wearing a kilt made of the tartan of the Clan MacDonald. Among the dominant colors of the plaid are blue and green, the school's colors. In addition, the names of the school newspaper - Minstrel - and the yearbook - Talisman - reflect the culture of the Scottish Highlands.

Physical building 
Originally designed as a model school for flexible scheduling, the building has several unique features and has proven adaptable to many situations. The school expanded in 1972, adding a new wing to the building as well as adding ninth grade to the student body. Thus, the class of 1976 was the first to spend four years at McKean. The school is currently undergoing construction to  update the labs and slowly upgrading the school's internal computer network. A new band room and several other new rooms are also being constructed.

Enrollment decline

According to the Delaware School Profiles, Thomas McKean High School is currently declining in enrollment. This may be due to a mix of changing area demographics, the Delaware school choice system, and increasing enrollment at charter and magnet schools across the state. It is, however, most likely due to the poor math, science and English attained by the students enrolled at the school.

In the year 2001, 1,354 students were enrolled at Thomas McKean High School. By the year 2007, 1,062 students were enrolled, a 19% drop.

During the 2013–14 school year, Thomas McKean High School was listed as having 874 students, a slight increase of 11 over the previous school year.

Student body
In 2020 about 20% of the students lived in the City of Wilmington. Almost all of them were Hispanic/Latino and/or African-American. Cris Barrish and Mark Eichmann of WHYY stated that McKean is "A school that matches Wilmington's demographics".

Academic performance
Circa 2021 about 5% of the students were proficient in mathematics and below 25% in English at grade level per Delaware state guidelines, respectively. Barrish and Eichmann wrote "McKean's performance is the opposite of Cab and Charter."

Notable alumni
Randy White, former professional football player inducted into the NFL Hall of Fame and College Football Hall of Fame; played 14 seasons with the Dallas Cowboys, including Super Bowl XXI of which he was named MVP.
Tom Verlaine, singer and guitarist of the rock band Television.

References

External links
 

High schools in New Castle County, Delaware
Public high schools in Delaware
1966 establishments in Delaware
Educational institutions established in 1966